The Williamston Martins were a minor league baseball team based in Williamston, North Carolina. From 1937 to 1941, the Martins played as exclusively as members of the Coastal Plain League, winning the 1939 league championship. Williamston hosted home minor league games at Taylor Field.

History
The Williamston "Martins" moniker was first used by a semi–pro team that played in an Independent league named the Coastal Plain League prior to minor league play.

Minor league baseball began in Williamston, North Carolina in 1937. The 1937 Williamston Martins, became charter members of the eight–team Class D level Coastal Plain League. Williamston joined the Ayden Aces, Goldsboro Goldbugs, Greenville Greenies, Kinston Eagles, New Bern Bears, Snow Hill Billies and Tarboro Combs in playing the first season of Class D level baseball for the league.

The Williamston use of the "Martins" moniker corresponds with the city of Williamston being the county seat of Martin County, North Carolina.

Beginning Coastal Plain League play on May 6, 1937, the Williamston Martins finished the regular season in 2nd place. The Martins ended the season with a record of 55–41, playing under manager Arthur Hauger in the eight–team Coastal Plain League. The Martins finished 6.0 games behind the 1st place Snow Hill Hill Billies in the final standings to qualify for the four–team playoffs. Williamston lost in the 1st round of the playoffs, as the Tarboro Combs defeated Williamston 3 games to 0. Snow Hill won the championship.

Continuing minor league play, the 1938 Williamston Martins placed 5th in the eight–team Coastal Plain League standings and did not qualify for the playoffs. Playing under returning manager Arthur Hauger, the Martins finished the 1938 season with a record of 56–56 in the Coastal Plain League. Williamston finished 7.0 games behind the 1st place New Bern Bears in the final standings, missing the playoffs, which were won by New Bern. Williamston pitcher James Rollins led the league with 202 strikeouts.

The Williamston Martins won the 1939 Coastal Plain League Championship. In the regular season, the Martins placed 3rd with a record of 65–57, playing under manager Paul  O'Malley, finishing 9.0 games behind the 1st place Greenville Greenies. In the 1st round of the playoffs,  Williamston defeated the Goldsboro Goldbugs 4 games to 1 to advance. in the Finals, the Williamston Martins won the championship, defeating the Kinston Eagles 4 games to 1. Pitcher Harry Swain of Williamston led the league with 186 strikeouts.

 
In the season following their championship, the 1940 Williamston Martins finished last in the Coastal Carolina League. The Martins placed 8th in the eight–team league, with a record of 47–78, playing under managers Dixie Parker and Harry Swain. Williamston finished 29.5 games behind the 1st place Wilson Tobs in the final league standings. Player/manager Harry Swain of Williamston again led the Coastal Carolina league with 215 strikeouts as a pitcher.

In their final season of play, the 1941 Williamston Martins did not qualify for the Coastal Carolina League playoffs. The Martins finished the 1941 season with a record of 56–61 to place 6th in the eight-team standings under manager Frank Rodgers. Williamston finished 31.0 games behind the 1st place Wilson Tobs in the final regular season standings. After the 1941 season playoffs, won by Wilson, the Coastal Carolina League folded due to World War II. When the league resumed play in 1946, Williamston did not field a team.

Williamston, North Carolina has not hosted another minor league team.

The ballpark
The Williamston Martins teams played home minor league games at Taylor Field. The ballpark reportedly had a capacity of 3,000 and dimensions (Left, Center, Right) of 290–320–340. The ballpark was noted to have been located behind the former Williamston High School at North Smithwick & Grace Street, Williamston, North Carolina.

Timeline

Year–by–year records

Notable alumni

Danny Gardella (1940)
Arthur Hauger (1937–1938)
Dixie Parker (1940, MGR) 
Les Rock (1940)
Chuck Stevens (1937)
Jim Stroner (1939)

See also
Williamston Martins players

References

External links
Baseball Reference

Defunct minor league baseball teams
Baseball teams disestablished in 1941
Baseball teams established in 1937
Defunct baseball teams in North Carolina
Professional baseball teams in North Carolina
Martin County, North Carolina
Coastal Plain League (minor league) teams